Taeja Nicole James (born 2002) is an English artistic gymnast. She participated in the 2016 European Women's Artistic Gymnastics Championships in Bern, Switzerland where she contributed to Great Britain's silver medal in the team competition.

Domestically, she won the 2017 British Artistic Gymnastics Championships in the Junior Women division.

Competition history

References 

Living people
2002 births
British female artistic gymnasts
Sportspeople from Nottingham
Black British sportswomen
Gymnasts at the 2018 Commonwealth Games
Commonwealth Games medallists in gymnastics
Commonwealth Games silver medallists for England
Medallists at the 2018 Commonwealth Games